Gísli Hannes Guðjónsson, CBE (born 26 October 1947) is an Icelandic-British academic, educator, forensic psychologist and former detective. He is Emeritus Professor at the Institute of Psychiatry of King's College London and a Professor in the Psychology Department at Reykjavik University. Gísli is an internationally renowned authority on suggestibility and false confessions and is one of the world's leading experts on false memory syndrome.

Biography
Gísli was born on 26 October 1947 to Guðjón Aðalsteinn Guðmundsson and Þóra Hannesdóttir. His twin brother joined the Reykjavik Criminal Investigation Police while he chose to study economics at Brunel University London (BSc, 1975), but changed to psychology whilst in his second year. He completed his studies at the University of Surrey (MSc, 1977; PhD, 1981). In 1982, together with MacKeith he coined the term memory distrust syndrome, to describe those who distrust their own memories and are motivated to rely on external (non-self) sources to verify the accuracy of memories.

In the 1990s he worked as head of forensic psychology services and clinical psychologist to the Bethlem Royal Hospital and Maudsley Hospital.

He was appointed Commander of the Order of the British Empire (CBE) in the 2011 Birthday Honours for services to clinical psychology.

Work
Gísli's expert testimony was the basis for the convictions of the Birmingham Six and Guildford Four being overturned. He created the Gudjonsson suggestibility scale to measure how susceptible someone is to coercion during an interrogation. An author of several books, Gudjonsson was a coauthor on the American Psychology-Law Society (AP-LS) White Paper by Saul Kassin et al. (2010) titled "Police-induced confessions: Risk factors and recommendations."

Selected list of publications
Psychology brings justice: the science of forensic psychology (Crim Behav Ment Health. 2003;13(3):159-67)
The Psychology of Interrogations and Confessions. A Handbook. Chichester: John Wiley & Sons. (2003)
Forensic Psychology. A Guide to Practice (with Lionel Haward)
The relationship between confabulation and intellectual ability, memory, interrogative suggestibility and acquiescence. (Personality and Individual Differences, 1995)
The Gudjonsson Suggestibility Scales Manual. Hove, UK: Psychology Press. (1997)
The Relationship Of Alcohol Withdrawal Symptoms To Suggestibility And Compliance. (Psychology, Crime & Law, June 2004, Vol. 10(2), pp. 169/177)
The Psychology of False Confessions: Forty Years of Science and Practice (2018)

See also
Guðmundur and Geirfinnur case
Memory distrust syndrome
Perjury

References

1947 births
Living people
Alumni of Brunel University London
Alumni of the University of Surrey
Academics of King's College London
British psychologists
Detectives
Forensic psychologists
Academic staff of Reykjavík University
Icelandic psychologists
Commanders of the Order of the British Empire
20th-century Icelandic scientists
20th-century British scientists
21st-century British scientists